Cancricepon is a genus of isopod crustaceans in the family Bopyridae. It has been synonymised with Merocepon Richardson, 1910.

Species
 Cancricepon anagibbosus Bourdon, 1971
 Cancricepon choprae (Nierstrasz & Brender à Brandis, 1925)
 Cancricepon elegans Giard & Bonnier, 1887
 Cancricepon garthi Danforth, 1970
 Cancricepon knudseni (Danforth, 1970)
 Cancricepon multituberosum An, Yu & Williams, 2012
 Cancricepon pilula Giard & Bonnier, 1887
 Cancricepon savignyi (Stebbing, 1910)
 Cancricepon xanthi (Richardson, 1910)

References

Isopod genera
Cymothoida